Bad Rippoldsau-Schapbach (Low Alemannic: Ribbeldsau-Schaba) is a municipality in the district of Freudenstadt in Baden-Württemberg in southern Germany.

Geography

The Municipality is located in the black forest in the Wolftal valley, 15 km away from Freudenstadt.
The Municipality is divided into two villages, Bad Rippoldsau and Schapbach. Bad Rippoldsau has an elevation of 560 meters and Schapbach has an elevation of 410 meters.

History
The first historical mention of Bad Rippoldsau was in 1179, of Schapbach in 1220. Until 1974 the two villages were two municipalities, but then they became one. Since the 15th century there has been a spa in Bad Rippoldsau.

Sights
- The Catholic pilgrimage church of Bad Rippoldsau, which was built in 1829 by Christoph Arnold, a pupil of Friedrich Weinbrenner.

- The baroque church of Schapbach

- The Kastelstein, a rock near Bad Rippoldsau.

- The Glaswaldsee, a cirque lake which was formed by glaciers during the last ice age

- The Burgbach Waterfall, at 32 metres, is one of the highest free-falling cascades in Germany

- From September 2010 there has been a wildlife park here with bears and wolves, located between the villages of Schapbach and Bad Rippoldsau.

Sport and recreation facilities

- The spa of Bad Rippoldsau

- The open air bath in Schapbach

Government
The current mayor of the municipality is Bernhard Waidele.

Personality 
 George Michael Gaisser (1595–1655), Prior in St. Nicholas and Lord in Klosterbad Rippoldsau during the Thirty Years' War
 Christian Haldenwang (1770–1831), artist and engraver, buried in Bad Rippoldsau
 Christoph Arnold (1779–1844), architect, builder of Rippoldsau Catholic Church
 Joseph Victor von Scheffel (1826–1886), writer, poet of  The emergence of Rippoldsau or the story of brother Rippold  and  The Sweden in Rippoldsau 
 Heinrich Hans Jacob (1837–1916), writer, author of numerous stories about the Wolf valley
 Marc Rosenberg (1852–1930), art historian, philologist and collector, owner of the "Schlössle" on the Schmiedsberg in Schapbach where parts of his collections were housed.
 Otto Goeringer (1853–1920), the hotel owner and operator of the spa
 Rainer Maria Rilke (1875–1926), poet, spa guest in Bad Rippoldsau
 Otto Kuner (1879–1953), lawyer and politician (BCSV, CDU) was born in Bad Rippoldsau
 Anna Schmid (1928–2010), long-time head of Rippoldsauer old plant, holder of the Federal Order of Merit
 Adolf J. Schmid (1934–2011), historian, local historian, author of several chronicles the upper Wolf valley, honorary citizen of
 Chris Weller (born 1957), musician and composer, grew up in Schapbach
 Ralf Bernd Herden (born 1960), Lawyer, lecturer, writer, historian, masonic scholar, mayor from 1991 to 2007
 Wolfram Lotz (born 1981), known playwright, grew up in Bad Rippoldsau

External links

References

Freudenstadt (district)
Spa towns in Germany